Gharjamai (  "live-in son-in- law") is a 2008 action Bengali film Directed by Anup Sengupta. This Anup Sengupta film is sometimes confused with the Hindi film Jamai Raja starring Anil Kapoor, Hema Malini and Madhuri Dixit. The title Gharjamai refers to a man who is financially dependent on his wife's family, which carries a social stigma in cultures of the Indian subcontinent.

Plot
Amar Banerjee has two wives who live in separate places. Mahim Ghoshal is Amar's conspiring manager. Amar's first wife Mamata feels insecure about Amar's second wife Sabitri, and Mahim takes advantage of the situation. Mahim advises Mamata to pay him to kill Sabitri. Mahim sends a killer who brutally knives Sabitri to death. In the heat of the moment the killer shoots and kills Sabitri's friend too. Sabitri's son Debnath and his best friend Shibnath manage to escape from the hired assassin with Shibnath's sister, Rani. After the children are separated. Debnath becomes Deba Mastan while Shibnath becomes Shiba. Rani becomes a torger and finds a sidekick within Pangla. Shibnath is raised by Amar Banerjee's driver Sanatan, an honest man. After Amar Banerjee's death Mahim Ghoshal carries out a plan to obtain the Banerjee property. He blackmails Mamata and coerces her to allow her daughter Tina to be married with Mahim's insane son Rocket. But Shibnath arrives at a crucial moment to save Tina from getting married with the hoodlum. Shibnath declares himself to be Tina's husband and therefore the son-in-law (Jamai) of the Bamerjee family. Shibnath begins his mission of fighting Mahim Ghoshal, Rocket and their allies. Mahim on the other hand brings Debnath as a wild card and introduces him to Mamata as Sabitri's long lost son. Mamata accepts Debnath as her stepson while Tina also gives consent. But as Shibnath and Debnath do not recognize each other as childhood friends, they constantly fight one another. Ultimately truth prevails. The childhood mystery of all three are revealed and while Mahim Ghoshal is punished, the entire family reunites again.

Cast 
 Prosenjit Chatterjee as Shiba / Shibnath
 Namrata Thapa as Tina, Shiba's wife
 Piya Sengupta as Rani
 Abhishek Chatterjee as Deba Mastan / Debnath
 Anamika Saha as Mamata, Shiba's mother-in-law
 Bodhisattwa Majumdar as Sanatan, Driver
 Dulal Lahiri as Amar Banerjee
 Mrinal Mukherjee as Mahim Ghosal
 Premjit as Rocket, Mahim Ghosal's son

References

External links

  www.screenindia.com preview

2008 films
2000s Bengali-language films
Bengali-language Indian films
Films directed by Anup Sengupta